Palaemon varians, known as the common ditch shrimp, river shrimp or Atlantic ditch shrimp, is a shrimp found from the Baltic Sea and the British Isles to the western Mediterranean Sea.

In the aquarium

Often sold by many aquarium retailers as feeder shrimp, river shrimp or grass shrimp and intended as live food for predatory aquarium life. However due to their high tolerance of varying salinity and temperature levels they can survive in marine, brackish or freshwater conditions in temperatures ranging from 1 °C to 30 °C for prolonged periods of time. They will feed on any leftover fish food, algae or plant life and are generally peaceful by nature when mixed with similar sized aquarium life.

References

Palaemonidae
Crustaceans of the Atlantic Ocean
Crustaceans described in 1814